Greensteds School is a Kenyan mixed day and boarding school situated  south of Nakuru, Nakuru County, Rift Valley Province.

Establishment and location
The school was established  in 1936 on a  piece of land.

Curriculum
The school provides an English curriculum at both International General Certificate of Secondary Education and A-levels in subjects in the arts ranging from French as second language to mathematics and the sciences.
The exam board may vary as Greensteds offers both Edexcel And CIE

Houses
Kibo  - Red
Batian - blue
Nelion - yellow

Sports
The school competes against other Kenyan international schools. In the Michaelmas term, cricket is played by both sexes.

The second term (Hilary) has hockey as the sport for both sexes. In the last term (Trinity) boys play rugby, football and basketball, while the girls play net ball.

Athletics is practiced, particularly before sports day (Michaelmas term). Events include short distances (100 m) and longer distances (1500 m) as well as long, triple and high jump.
 
The school has a 25-meter-long swimming pool, opened in 2000, which is the scene of internal and inter-school swimming competitions particularly in Hilary term.

Other sports practiced are karate, tennis, cycling, hiking, athletics, football, dance, horse riding, taekwondo, gym, golf, cross country running, and Field Athletics.

The school does not accept other extreme sports(motorcycles) for the safety of other students.

Performing arts
The school has a performing arts department that runs music tours featuring an all-student band and choir to locations in Kenya and abroad, promoting causes such as Operation Smile. The school often has a production of its own which casts students of all ages to perform.

The performing arts department also has a Lipala Festival in which students with musical talents from other schools can come and compete in musical competitions with visitors also being invited.

Sporting areas
Greensteds has two main large fields each big enough for three soccer pitches/ Rugby fields and can also be utilized for hockey, cricket, and athletics.

The school field also has a street soccer arena as well as a basketball court and a well-sized pool

See also

 Education in Kenya
 List of boarding schools
 List of cricket grounds in Kenya
 List of international schools
 List of schools in Kenya

References
Greensteds school website

Boarding schools in Kenya
Buildings and structures in Rift Valley Province
Co-educational boarding schools
Cricket grounds in Kenya
Education in Nakuru County
International high schools
International schools in Kenya
High schools and secondary schools in Kenya
Educational institutions established in 1936
1936 establishments in Kenya